The athletics competition at the 1991 Pan American Games was held in Havana, Cuba.

Medal summary

Men's events

Women's events

Medal table

Participating nations

See also
1991 in athletics (track and field)

References
GBR Athletics

 
1991
Athletics
Pan American Games
International athletics competitions hosted by Cuba